Karyn Monk is a Canadian author of historical romance novels. Her books have appeared on the USA Today Bestseller List, and have won numerous awards.

Biography

Personal life
Monk is the fourth child of John and Lorraine (Spurrell) Monk.  Because her parents had expected a boy, they had not chosen a girl's name, and decided to name their new daughter after the delivery room nurse.  Neither parent was sure how to spell the name "Karen," though, leading to the unique spelling they chose.

Monk graduated from university with a degree in history.  She planned to work in advertising and in her spare time perform in local musicals.  While auditioning for a part in an original musical called "Last Tango in Fargo North Dakota," she met her future husband, Philip, who was that show's music director. The marriage produced three children: Genevieve (b 1998), Carson (b 2001), and Adelaide (b 2005).  The family lives in Toronto, Ontario.

Writing career
With her husband's support, Monk soon left her job in fashion advertising to pursue her dream of writing.  After two years of work on her first manuscript, she obtained an agent, who eventually sold her book, "Surrender to a Stranger," to Bantam.  The novel was later nominated for Best First Book by Romantic Times.  A USAToday bestselling author, Monk has received critical acclaim for her sensual, powerful novels.  She has been awarded many honors, including the Aspen Gold, Barclay Gold, the National Readers' Choice Award, and a Romantic Times Career Achievement Award.

Monk took a break from writing, beginning in 2005, to spend time with her three young children.

Awards and recognition
1995 - Romantic Times nominee for Best First Historical Romance, Surrender to a Stranger
1998 - Romantic times nominee for The Witch and the Warrior
2003 - Romantic Times Career Achievement Award for Historical Adventure
2004 - Daphne du Maurier Award winner for Mystery/Suspense for My Favorite Thief
2004 - Second place in the Barclay Gold Award for My Favorite Thief
2004 - Romance Writers of America RITA Award finalist for My Favorite Thief
2004 - Golden Quill Award finalist for My Favorite Thief
2004 - Aspen Gold Award finalist for My Favorite Thief
2004 - Orange Rose Award finalist for My Favorite Thief
2004 - Booksellers' Best Award finalist for My Favorite Thief
2005 - Aspen Gold Award winner for Every Whispered Word
2005 - Daphne du Maurier Award for Excellence in Mystery/Suspense winner for Every Whispered Word
2005 - Romantic Times Nominee, Every Whispered Word

Bibliography

Single novels
Surrender to a Stranger, 1994
The Rebel and the Redcoat, 1996

Warriors Series
Once a Warrior, 1997
The Witch and the Warrior, 1998
The Rose and the Warrior, 2000

Kent Family Saga Series
The Prisoner, 2001
The Wedding Escape, 2003
My Favorite Thief, 2004
Every Whispered Word, 2005

Anthologies in collaboration
"Saving Celeste" in the anthology MY GUARDIAN ANGEL, 1995 (with Sandra Chastain, Kay Hooper, Susan Krinard and Elizabeth Thornton)

References

External links
 Karyn Monk Official website

Living people
Canadian women novelists
Canadian romantic fiction writers
Place of birth missing (living people)
Women romantic fiction writers
20th-century Canadian novelists
21st-century Canadian novelists
20th-century Canadian women writers
21st-century Canadian women writers
1960 births